The 1920 Southwest Texas State Bobcats football team was an American football team that represented Southwest Texas State Normal School—now known as Texas State University–as an independent during the 1920 college football season. The 1920 Southwest Texas State team adopted the nickname "Bobcats" after the University Star had an editorial campaign to adopt an athletic mascot. Prior to this season the team had no nickname.

Bobcats were led by second-year head coach Oscar W. Strahan and played their home games at Evans Field in San Marcos, Texas. The team's captain was Jesse C. Kellam, who played halfback. Southwest Texas State finished the season with a record of 5–2–1.

Schedule

References

Southwest Texas State
Texas State Bobcats football seasons
Southwest Texas State Bobcats football